Ulrich Graf (15 August 1946 – 19 June 1977) was a Grand Prix motorcycle road racer from Switzerland. His best year was in 1976 when he won the 50cc Yugoslavian Grand Prix and finished in third place in the 50cc world championship, behind Angel Nieto and Herbert Rittberger. Graf was killed while competing at the 1977 Yugoslavian Grand Prix.

References 

1946 births
1977 deaths
Swiss motorcycle racers
50cc World Championship riders
125cc World Championship riders
350cc World Championship riders
Motorcycle racers who died while racing
Sport deaths in Yugoslavia